Theunis Jonck (24 January 1926 – 6 April 2012) was a South African weightlifter. He competed in the men's middle heavyweight event at the 1952 Summer Olympics.

References

1926 births
2012 deaths
South African male weightlifters
Olympic weightlifters of South Africa
Weightlifters at the 1952 Summer Olympics
Place of birth missing